Lasserre-Pradère is a commune in the department of Haute-Garonne, southern France. The municipality was established on 1 January 2018 by merger of the former communes of Lasserre (the seat) and Pradère-les-Bourguets.

See also 
Communes of the Haute-Garonne department

References 

Communes of Haute-Garonne